Stewart William Bainum Sr. (1919–2014) was an American businessman and philanthropist. He was the founder, chairman and chief executive officer of Choice Hotels, a hotel chain, and HCR Manor Care, a retirement facility chain.  He was the founder of the Commonweal Foundation (now known as the Bainum Family Foundation), a philanthropic organization.

Early life
Stewart W. Bainum Sr. was born on June 10, 1919, in Detroit, Michigan. His father, Charles Bainum, worked for the Ford Motor Company in Detroit until he was dismissed during the Great Depression and worked for the Works Progress Administration in Cincinnati, Ohio. He had two brothers, Robert and Irvin, and a sister, June Hill.

Stewart was educated at the Mount Vernon Academy, a Seventh-day Adventist boarding school in Mount Vernon, Ohio. He dropped out due to financial distress, but graduated years later. Meanwhile,  attended the Washington Adventist University.

Business career
Bainum hitch-hiked to Washington, D.C., in 1936, where he took menial jobs. With his savings, he started a plumbing business. He later became a real estate developer and real estate investor. He served as the chairman of Realty Investment Co.

Bainum was the co-founder of a hotel in Silver Spring, Maryland, in 1957. Over the years, he opened more hotels and founded Quality Inns International, later known as Choice Hotels. He served as its chairman and chief executive officer until 1987, and served on its board of directors until 2000.

Meanwhile, Bainum opened a retirement facility with his brother in 1960. Over the years, he opened over 200 retirement facilities and established Manor Care. Through a 1998 merger with the Health Care and Retirement Corp., it became known as HCR Manor Care. He served as its chairman and chief executive officer until 1987 and served on its board of directors until 2000.

Philanthropy
Bainum co-founded the Commonweal Foundation, now known as the Bainum Family Foundation, with his wife in 1968. Through their foundation, they donated US$12 million to students from lower socio-economic backgrounds in Washington, D.C. and Baltimore. Moreover, under the aegis of the I Have A Dream Foundation, he covered the college tuition of Kramer Junior High School graduates in 1988.

Personal life
Bainum married Jane Goyne. They resided in Silver Spring, followed by Chevy Chase, Maryland. They had two sons, Stewart W. Bainum Jr. and Bruce Bainum, and two daughters,  Barbara and Roberta.

Death
Bainum died of pneumonia on February 12, 2014, at the Johns Hopkins Hospital in Baltimore, Maryland.

References

1919 births
2014 deaths
Businesspeople from Detroit
People from Silver Spring, Maryland
People from Chevy Chase, Maryland
American company founders
American chief executives
American chairpersons of corporations
American corporate directors
Deaths from pneumonia in Maryland
20th-century American businesspeople
20th-century American philanthropists